Siem Bouk District is a district located in Stung Treng Province, in north-east Cambodia. According to the 1998 census of Cambodia, it had a population of 10,235.

References 

Districts of Stung Treng province